Catch Hell (also known as Chained or as Kidnapped) is a 2014 American thriller film written and directed by Ryan Phillippe. It is the only non-horror film from Twisted Pictures.

Synopsis
A faded Hollywood actor is kidnapped and subjected to both physical and psychological torture.

Plot 

Washed up Hollywood actor Reagan Pierce arrives in Louisiana to begin filming his new movie 'Flashpoint'. Reagan meets with the director in the lobby of the hotel. He gets interrupted by fans and takes a picture with them. He gets antsy about his director. Later he heads to the gym to work out. Multiple people are constantly staring at him, with a creepy vibe. He calls his manager, not wanting to do the movie. The manager basically says "Come on: You know you have to."

The next morning, he walks out of the lobby when a van pulls up. Assuming it is there to take him there to take him to the set, he gets in. They take him out to the middle of nowhere. After a while, he starts to worry: He does not know the number to call to check on rehearsal, so he asks the car's passengers. Junior, the front passenger, offers to type in the number for him.  When Reagan hands him his cell phone, Junior does not hand it back, instead he pockets it and does not give it back when Reagan asks.

They speed up and stop in front of a shack out in the middle of nowhere. Pulling Reagan out of the van and throwing him to the ground, Mike, the driver, punches him in the back of the head repeatedly until Reagan passes out. The two men carry him into the shack. Reagan's phone rings back in his hotel room, but he is not here. The film crew cannot find him for the movie.

In the shack, Reagan wakes up. His feet are being tied together. His hands are already chained. They dump out his belongings and walk out of the shack. Reagan realizes the chain on his hand is also fastened to the wall, and he cannot leave.

Reagan tries to talk to Mike about ransom, saying he can get him at least a million dollars and no one would ever know what happened. Mike comes in and says he does not care about money, takes out a knife and cuts down Reagan's face, from his temple down his cheek to his chin. He says his wife is Diana. Reagan says he does not know who Diana is.

Mike leaves the room and comes back with bolt cutters, telling him bolt cutters can cut through anything such as the chains trapping Reagan but Mike intends to use them to cut something off Reagan that is a lot softer. As he starts trying to pull off Reagan's pants, Junior walks in and asks what he is doing. Mike says he is going to cut off his balls. Junior tells him not to, because he'll bleed out on the floor, then reminds him he had wanted Reagan to stay alive for a while. Mike then tells Junior to give him the "gator thumper" – essentially a cudgel with a heavy lead / metal head. Mike then takes Reagan's hands and stands on the chain so he cannot move his hands, and beats his hands with the gator thumper, breaking his hands into a bloody pulp. He then hits Reagan in the head, knocking him unconscious again.

When Reagan comes to, his hand is bandaged. Junior is hovering agitated nearby and says how they thought he was dead as he had not moved in a day." Then gives him an oxy pill for pain. He says the pain will kill him before Mike does, if he does not swallow the pill. Mike walks in and tries to get him to remember his wife, saying she worked in wardrobe on one of his movies. Reagan says he does not remember, but if he did, he would never knowingly sleep with another man's wife.

Mike asks for his password to his phone. Reagan gives it to him. Mike pulls up the last info on his phone about 'Diana' and remarks that Reagan "never deletes any of his stuff". He gets mad after hereads back texts to her, and walks out after throwing the phone hard into Reagan's chest. Junior grabs the phone and finds naked photos of Reagan's actress ex-girlfriend, and a naked photo of Reagan. Mike breaks into Reagan's laptop with the password.

The next morning, Junior is trying to feed Reagan something. Mike walks in and gets mad that he is trying to feed him. Mike reveals that he sent those naked pictures out to a lot of news sites. Then says it is time to feed the gators, which is where he goes into a room with a hole in the floor and swamp below, and defecates through the hole. He sends an anti-Semitic message via Reagan's Twitter account.

Mike reveals that before he kills him, he wants to destroy Reagan's reputation and take everything from him, leaving him with nothing. But first, he is going to re-record Reagan's cell phone voicemail – making Reagan read it out loud, and he better make Mike "believe it". Reagan reads it to himself and tells him "it's weak, no one talks that way". Then he says that if he wants it to sound crazy, he'll make it crazy. He records a message that says "don't call me anymore, f*** off everybody. Especially Kristy, the Jews – praise be the Allah." He "will die an enlightened man."

Cut to the news reporting how Reagan is going crazy and claiming the photo leaks and tweets.

Cuts back to the shack. Mike walks in and tells him he "did good with the message". "You should be an actor." Mike reveals he used to be a cop. They took his badge a year ago for a domestic abuse charge. He then wants Reagan to tell him the story of how he hooked up with his wife. Reagan tells Mike that he gave her a ride home from work, saw a kitten she was keeping, then she tells Reagan about her abusive husband who beats her. Reagan just listened, and she cried. She led him into the bedroom and they had intercourse, making her orgasm four times. Reagan tells Mike that she said he could never make her orgasm.

Mike snaps, throws Reagan down and tases him. Reagan tells Mike to kill him. Mike says "not yet", and walks out to leave.

Junior pulls up. Mike tells him that he lost his "s*** in there", and that he'll "be back tomorrow", and "hopes Reagan stays alive until then". Mike tells Junior not to get soft on Reagan. Mike leaves, and Junior stays behind.

Junior walks in the shack and sees blood pooling on and leaking through the floor. Junior sees a pool of blood by Reagan's face and finds a tooth. It looks like Mike pulled Reagan's tooth out of his mouth after tasing him. Junior puts the tooth into his pocket.

Reagan wakes up to see a gator inches from his face with Junior on top of it, saying he just saved his life. He "ain't ever seen a gator come all the way inside the shack before. He probably smelled all that blood" and heard Reagan thrashing around. Junior then shoots the gator in the head and drags it out. He puts Reagan on a cot and wipes some blood off his mouth from where his tooth was pulled. 
Junior gets a phone call from Mike. Junior tells Mike that "He is still alive".

Cut to Mike in town at a security checkpoint.

Cut to Junior skinning the gator. He snorts some cocaine and is out around the woods. Reagan tries to get a knife off the wall, but falls, making noise. Junior hears it and comes in checking on the noise. Reagan admits he made some noise, accidentally. Junior just says "mmhmm". Reagan asks to piss, and asks him not to make him pee on himself again. Junior agrees, but says he has to keep his hands tied. He unhooks him from the wall. Reagan says he cannot walk. Then tells Junior he cannot run, even if he wanted to, his legs are messed up and he does not even know where they are. Junior agrees, but says if he tries to run, he will snap him down. Junior takes him to the "bathroom" where there's a hole in the floor. Reagan thinks about jumping through the hole. Instead, he just pees and comes back out to Junior. The phone rings, and Junior say he has to answer. He is trying to get Reagan back on the cot immediately, so he can answer the phone, since Mike is checking in. He gets to it. Reagan asks what Mike is going to do to him. He tries to tell Junior that Mike is crazy. Asks him how he does not know Mike will not turn on Junior and kill him too, since once Reagan is dead, Junior will be the only witness.

Meanwhile, Mike is checking out all Reagan's bad publicity from the twitter posts and leaked photos. Mike is laughing hysterically.

The next day, Junior is grilling gator meat. He comes in and tells Reagan some sun might do him some good. He pulls him outdoors and tells him he'll help him take his shirt off and put sun cream on him. He does not, but he goes over to some post in the ground and does some chin ups and looks back over at Reagan, kind of heatedly. He is heard masturbating in a room in the house.  the phone rings, and Junior comes out to answer it. Reagan is still chained to the cot outside. Mike says he is at work, creating his alibi and should return around 1:30ᴀᴍ. Junior questions his own alibi. Mike says he does not need one. They hang up.

Mike visits his ex-wife, Diana. She tells him he is not supposed to be there. Mike says he feels different, that he is not a violent man anymore. She says she will think about him seeing the kids. She asks for the cat and he grabs the cat off the porch, and hands it to Diana. Diana closes the door.

Back at the shack, Junior tells Reagan he loves his movies. That he used to be so cool, but he still loves his movies. Junior tells him he must take care of himself to look younger. Reagan tells Junior he looks pretty fit, asks if he works out; Junior is flattered.

The TV news posits the photo leaks and tweets may not be what they seem, as there is surveillance video of Reagan getting into a van at the hotel, but all his belongings are still in his hotel room. Also, the voicemail he recorded is actually a verbatim quote from a movie he was in, where he was a kidnapped soldier. 'Kristy' was the name of Reagan's character in that movie.

The police are now looking for the van and the whereabouts of Reagan Pierce. They're not sure if it is some sort of code or a suicide threat. 
Back at the shack, Junior gives Reagan some gator meat. Reagan says it is good. Junior tells him he has a nice smile. Looks like he is flirting a little. Reagan picks up on it and asks if he has a girlfriend. Junior says no. Asks if Reagan has a girlfriend. Reagan says no, he just ended things. Then says, maybe it is time for something different. Junior offers him some more gator meat. Reagan says yes. While Junior walks away, Reagan grabs the extra length of his chain and puts it under his leg. Junior asks him if he ever tried it on with a dude. Reagan says if he gets drunk enough he is typically down for whatever. Junior tells him he has some whiskey. He goes to get the whiskey and does a little cocaine. Junior pours some whiskey into his mouth. Reagan says "it's working already."
Junior says his heart is beating fast.

Junior starts kissing his neck. Reagan freaks out and says to get off him. Says he cannot. Junior walks away upset. Reagan tries to calm him down. Junior says it is alright, because he 'roofied' [drugged] his gator stew. Junior "just has to wait a bit, and then he can get him at night." Reagan starts to feel the effects of the roofie, and seems to pass out. Junior walks over puts his hands in his mouth, getting aroused. He pulls off Reagan's pants. He takes off his own pants, and is about to rape Reagan when the phone rings. Reagan head-butts him and takes the chain, wraps it around Junior's neck, and strangles him.

Reagan is overcome by the drug and passes out. Mike tries to call back again, and sees in a google search there's a "mystery vehicle" the authorities are looking for in connection with Reagan's disappearance. Mike freaks and is driving there and calling over and over. Reagan wakes up to a gator snapping at Junior's legs. It bites Junior and carries him out the shack. Reagan can see the phone continues to light up with Mike calling. Reagan is able to get the chain off the wall, but cannot undo his wrists.

Mike drives to Junior's mother's house looking for Junior; Junior is not there. He mentions that the road to the shack is flooded, and that he is going to take a boat. 
Meanwhile, Reagan walks out of the shack to a car in the yard and sees keys in the vehicle. He gets in and tries to start the car, but it does not work.

Mike drives the boat up and gets out. He slips and sees Junior's dead body on the edge of the water and he gets angry. Mike goes to the shack and looks around for Reagan in there. There are no lights, so he is walking around with a flashlight. Mike says "oh, he's outside" after he cannot find him in the shack and starts to walk back to the door. He sees Reagan and says he has "got him". Reagan says "yeah, you got me", and shoots Mike with some sort of spear gun. Mike drops and Reagan takes the gator thumper and beats Mike to death.

Later, a reporter is interviewing Reagan, with his arm in a cast; she asks when did he think he was going to live. He says he did not at first, because even though the kidnappers were both dead, he still had to get to a boat, and he knew alligators were roaming around. So he thought to wait until morning. Reagan was pretty incoherent in the morning but he got in the boat. He was yelling, and men who were out fishing heard him. They found him and carried to land and got him to a hospital.

Reagan has returned home and gets a phone call from his manager, who says that his interview got amazing views. Everybody wants him in their movies.That night, Reagan pulls up his e‑mails on his computer and finds an e‑mail from Junior, apologizing for the way they met but reminding him that there was some good in it. Attached is a video Junior took using Reagan's phone. The video shows Reagan on the cot and Junior with the alligator skin on his back. He dances around the room like an alligator. Junior and Reagan are laughing in the video clip.

Cast
 Ryan Phillippe as Reagan Pearce
 Ian Barford as Mike
 Stephen Louis Grush as Reginald 'Junior' Hester Jr.
 Tig Notaro as Careen Hester
 Russ Russo as Tim Remmit
 James DuMont as Tony Cunningham
 Joyful Drake as Diane
 Ray Wood as Butch
 Carol Sutton as Delores
 Heidi Brook Myers as Rhonda
 Jillian Barberie as herself
 Michael Boyne as Howard Kyle (uncredited)
 Forrest Forte as David (uncredited)

Development
The film was first announced in 2012, as Ryan Phillippe's directional debut under the title Shreveport. It was financed by producer Mark Burg through his Twisted Pictures label, and it was filmed in Louisiana.

The new title Catch Hell was confirmed on July 17, 2014. It was distributed by Entertainment One Films. The trailer was released on July 31, 2014.

Reception
On review aggregator Rotten Tomatoes, the film holds an approval rating of 0% based on 6 reviews, with an average rating of 3.81/10. On Metacritic, the film has a weighted average score of 40 out of 100, based on 6 critics, indicating "mixed or average reviews".

Movie Nation called it "nothing more than the sort of exploitation film that Reagan Pearce has signed onto, in desperation, one that he and we realize will be no game changer for the movie star on screen or the one behind the camera." Slant Magazine awarded it one out of five stars, saying "Phillippe never digs into Pearce as a person, or ponders the solitary nature of the actor's lifestyle, and the effect, which lasts right up until the inevitable and self-serving conclusion in which Pearce's career is resuscitated in the wake of all the media coverage surrounding his disappearance, is that he's kept at a distance from the audience" The New York Times said "But a certain curiosity value arises out of Mr. Phillippe's coincidental occupation here as a professional actor and a director." We Got This Covered said, "I'm not saying I'll ever know what it feels like to be scrutinized by every gossipy website and television show, but Catch Hell is a failed attempt to help audiences understand the trials and tribulations of actors forced into an obsessive limelight." The Village Voice was more positive, saying "Catch Hell might not catapult Phillippe back into the spotlight, but as Junior, Grush is by turns ashamed, bashful, and dangerous; he could perhaps do more if given the chance."

References

External links

2014 films
2014 thriller drama films
American thriller drama films
Films about kidnapping
Films about missing people
Films set in Louisiana
Films shot in Louisiana
American independent films
Films about actors
Films scored by the Newton Brothers
2014 drama films
2014 independent films
2010s English-language films
2010s American films